The Golden Bell Award for Best Supporting Actor in a Television Series is one of the categories of the competition for the Taiwanese television production, Golden Bell Awards. It is presented annually by the Government Information Office, Taiwan. The first time that television programs were first eligible to be awarded was in 1971.

Winners and nominees
The Best Supporting Actor category was first awarded in 1993.

1990s

2000s

2010s

2020s

Notes

References

Supporting Actor in a Television Series, Best
Golden Bell Awards, Best Supporting Actor